Rissooidea, originally named Rissoacea by Gray, 1847, is a taxonomic superfamily of small and minute marine  snails, belonging to the clade Littorinimorpha.

With their phylogenetic analysis of rissooidean and cingulopsoidean families, Criscione F. & Ponder W.F. (2013) have created the superfamily Truncatelloidea containing many families previously included in the superfamily Rissooidea. They have shown that Rissooidea was not monophyletic, encompassing two major clades, i.e. Risooidea s.s. and Truncatelloidea. The freshwater, brackish water, and semi-terrestrial families and genera were brought under Truncatelloidea.

Families
Families within the superfamily Rissooidea include:
 Barleeiidae Gray, 1857
 Emblandidae Ponder, 1985
 Helicostoidae Pruvot-Fol, 1937
 Lironobidae Ponder, 1967
 † Mesocochliopidae Yu, 1987
 † Palaeorissoinidae Gründel & Kowalke, 2002 
 Rissoidae Gray, 1847
 Rissoinidae Stimpson, 1865
 Zebinidae Coan, 1964

Genera unassigned to a family
 † Avardaria Ali-Zade, 1932 
 † Choerina Brusina, 1882
 † Fossarulus Neumayr, 1869 
 † Schuettemmericia Schlickum, 1961
 † Staadtiellopsis Schlickum, 1968
 † Zilchiola Kadolsky, 1993
 Family names brought into synonymy
 Anabathronidae Coan, 1964: synonym of Anabathridae Keen, 1971
 Ansolidae Slavoshevskaya, 1975: synonym of Barleeiidae Gray, 1857
 Barleeidae Gray, 1857: synonym of Barleeiidae Gray, 1857
 Coxielladda Iredale and Whiteley, 1938: belongs to the family Pomatiopsidae
 † Ctyrokya Schlickum, 1965 : belongs to the family Hydrobiidae 
 Gabbia Tryon, 1865: synonym of Bithynia (Gabbia) Tryon, 1865, alternate representation of Bithynia Leach, 1818
 Rissoidea: misspelling of Rissooidea

Nomenclature
This superfamily was previously known as Rissoacea. Prior to the recent ruling by the ICZN, many invertebrate superfamily names ended in the suffix -acea, or -aceae, not -oidea as now required according to ICZN article 29.2. The suffix -oidea used to be used for some subclasses and superorders, where it is still found. In much of the older literature including Keen 1958, Moore et al. 1952, and the Treatise on Invertebrate Paleontology, gastropod superfamilies are written with the suffix -acea.

References

 
Littorinimorpha